(also known as Band of Ninja) is a 1967 Japanese film directed by Nagisa Ōshima. It is based on Sanpei Shirato's manga Ninja Bugeichō. Rather than being an animated adaption, Ōshima decided to simply shoot the panels of the manga in order, adding narration and zooming and panning techniques.

Plot
The son of a murdered feudal lord meets a renegade ninja helping peasants and farmers rebel against Oda Nobunaga.

Cast
Yuki jutaro - Kei Yamamoto
Akemi - Akiko Koyama
Oda Nobunaga- Hikaru Hayashi
Toyotomi Hideyoshi - Fumio Watanabe
Akechi Mitsuhide - Shigeru Tsuyuguchi
Kagemaru - Rokko Toura

References

External links

1967 films
Films directed by Nagisa Ōshima
Japanese black-and-white films
1960s Japanese-language films
Live-action films based on manga
1960s Japanese films